The Confederación Sudamericana de Rugby (CONSUR) B Division Championship in Valencia, Venezuela was played out during September 2012.  The Championship will double as a 2015 Rugby World Cup qualifier, with the winner to play against the 2012 NACRA Caribbean champions, Bermuda, for the right to playoff against Brazil.  The winner of this final match will be promoted to the 2013 CONSUR Division "A" Championship.

Paraguay were crowned champions, after going through their three matches undefeated, against Venezuela, Colombia and Peru.

2012 CONSUR B Championship

Number in brackets indicates the pre-tournament IRB ranking of team

Match Schedule

Related Page 
 2012 South American Rugby Championship "A"
 2012 South American Rugby Championship "C"

External links 
 Details

References 

2012
2012 rugby union tournaments for national teams
B
rugby union
rugby union
rugby union
rugby union
International rugby union competitions hosted by Venezuela